Allen Garfield (born Allen Goorwitz; November 22, 1939 – April 7, 2020) was an American film and television actor.

Early life
Garfield was born in Newark, New Jersey, to a Jewish family, the son of Alice (née Lavroff) and Philip Goorwitz. He had one sister, Lois. A 1957 graduate of Weequahic High School, he was a sports reporter and Golden Gloves boxer before becoming an actor. He attended The Actors Studio in New York City, studying with both Lee Strasberg and Elia Kazan, and worked on stage before acting in film.

Career
Garfield appeared in over 100 films and television shows. He is known for having played nervous villains, corrupt businessmen and politicians. In addition he appeared in two art films by German director Wim Wenders, Der Stand der Dinge and Bis ans Ende der Welt. Quentin Tarantino studied with Garfield at the beginning his career as an actor. Garfield's  lead roles included the 1971 film Cry Uncle!, the 1978 film Skateboard with Leif Garrett and the 1982 film Get Crazy. He appeared in the Tales from the Darkside episode The Deal (1988).

Personal life and death
For a year after his father's death and in tribute to him, Allen used his family name, Goorwitz, for his screen credits.

When Garfield suffered a stroke before filming his role in The Ninth Gate (1999), director Roman Polanski opted to use Garfield's paralyzed face for his character rather than conceal it or recast the role.  Garfield suffered another massive stroke in 2004 and thereafter was a long-term nursing care resident at The Motion Picture Home.

Garfield died of complications related to COVID-19 and his previous strokes at the Motion Picture & Television Country House and Hospital on April 7, 2020. He was 80 years old.

Filmography

References

External links
 
 Allen Garfield at the University of Wisconsin's Actors Studio audio collection
 

1939 births
2020 deaths
Male actors from Newark, New Jersey
American male film actors
American male television actors
Jewish American male actors
Weequahic High School alumni
Deaths from the COVID-19 pandemic in California
Burials at Forest Lawn Memorial Park (Glendale)